The 1995 UCI Mountain Bike World Championships were held in Kirchzarten, Germany from 18 to 19 September 1995. These were the sixth annual UCI world championships in mountain biking and the first to be held in Germany.

Alison Sydor of Canada successfully defended her world title in the women's cross country. The men's cross country was won by Bart Brentjens of the Netherlands, who would win the first Olympic gold medal in men's cross country the following year at the 1996 Summer Olympics in Atlanta.

Nicolas Vouilloz of France won the men's downhill in his first year in the elite category, after having won the junior men's downhill world title the three previous years. Leigh Donovan of the United States won the women's downhill.

Medal summary

Men's events

Women's events

Medal table

References

External links

UCI Mountain Bike World Championships
1995 UCI Mountain Bike World Championships
UCI Mountain Bike World Championships